119 is the fourth studio album by American hardcore punk band Trash Talk, released on October 9, 2012 via Trash Talk Collective along with Odd Future Records and RED Distribution. It is the first album by the band to be released on Odd Future Records, after Trash Talk signed with Odd Future's label on May 30, 2012. It is also the first studio album to be released on the label that is not performed by a member of Odd Future. A music video for the first official single, "F.E.B.N.", was posted onto YouTube on August 30, 2012.

Track listing

Personnel
Trash Talk
 Lee Spielman – vocals
 Garrett Stevenson – guitar
 Spencer Pollard – bass, vocals
 Sam Bosson – drums

Additional personnel
 Hodgy Beats – guest vocals on "Blossom & Burn"
 Tyler, The Creator – guest vocals on "Blossom & Burn"

Chart positions

References

2012 albums
Trash Talk (band) albums
RED Distribution albums
Odd Future Records albums